Elizabeth Nutaraluk Aulatjut (1914–1998) was an Inuit sculptor.

Her work is included in the collections of the Musée national des beaux-arts du Québec the University of Winnipeg and the McMichael Canadian Art Collection

References

1914 births
1998 deaths
20th-century Canadian artists
Inuit artists
Artists from Nunavut